Jabala ibn al-Ayham was the last ruler, or phylarch, of the Ghassanid dynasty in Syria in the 7th century. He commanded Arab Christian tribal contingents on behalf of the Byzantine Empire against Arab Muslim forces during the Muslim conquest of Syria in the 630s. In the battles of Dumat al-Jandal in northern Arabia and the decisive battle of Yarmuk in southern Syria in 636, his forces were defeated. He supposedly converted to Islam, before breaking ties with the faith in protest to indignities he consequently suffered related to Islamic egalitarian principles. Afterward, he left Syria permanently, taking refuge with his tribesmen in Byzantine Anatolia. Historians are divided on the historicity of Jabala due the lack of contemporary source material, with some arguing his personality was essentially a literary device of later Islamic writers.

Sources
There are no contemporary sources about Jabala, with the narratives of his life derived from Abbasid-era (post-750 CE) literature. However, a seal dated to the late 6th or early 7th century inscribed with the words 'Gabala, patrikios' next to etches of Christian crosses has led to speculative identification with Jabala ibn al-Ayham by the historian Irfan Shahid.

Life
In the stories of Jabala in the Islamic literature, he is figured as the last Ghassanid king and a military leader of the Byzantine Empire's Christian Arab contingent during the Muslim conquest of Syria. According to the Abbasid-era authors Ibn Ishaq, al-Waqidi, and al-Baladhuri, in Yarmouk, Jabala led 12,000 men of the Ghassanids and the other Christian tribes of Lakhm, Judham, and groups of the Quda'a tribe, such as the Balqayn and Bali. 

The Islamic literature abounds with stories of Jabala's conversion to Islam sometime after Yarmouk, then leaving Islam and taking refuge under Emperor Heraclius. There are different versions of the stories, but they generally have Jabala arrive to the Muslim capital at Medina with his entourage, set off for the Hajj pilgrimage with Caliph Umar, have an altercation with a lowly pilgrim whose he ultimately breaks, threaten to leave Islam, and finally make a nightly escape which ends with his relocation to Byzantine territory. 

The geographer al-Istakhri mentions the descendants of these tribesmen in that region during the 10th century. According to the historian Walter Kaegi, the purported flight of so many Arab tribesmen was a motivating factor for the Muslims to conquer Raqqa and Upper Mesopotamia in general, so as to prevent such nomadic exodus from the conquered lands to Byzantium; such exodus contravened caliph Umar's policy of subjugating all nomadic Arab tribes under the Caliphate's rule.

Negotioations with Rashiduns
Before the Battle of Yarmuk Jabala went over to the Muslim camp to try and negotiate peace terms. Once in the Muslim camp, Jabala warned against the futility of fighting the combined forces of the Roman empire. He invited his southern kinsmen to keep all their plunder on condition that they withdraw back to Arabia. This would not do: “We have tasted blood and find none sweeter than the blood of Romans,” Ubada ibn al-Samit, one of the prophet Muhammad's companions, told him. As for the Christians’ vast numbers, “Our fighters and heroes see death as gain and life as burdensome.” Ubada then invited Jabala and his Christian tribe to embrace Islam as fellow Arabs, “for it will honor you in this world and the next.” Jabala was angered and refused: “I will never abandon my religion [Christianity].” Ubada warned him that “there will never be peace between us unless you pay jizya or accept Islam” and that behind him was "an army that conquers all lands leaving them desolate" and that he would "share the same fate as the Romans if the blade of our swords reach you" should he and the Ghassanids join the battle. Jabala (even more angry) refused again. “By Allah!” exclaimed Ubada, “were treachery not so odious [Jabala had entered the Muslim camp under a flag of truce], I would have struck you down here with my sword right now”. The Muslims continued to harbor hopes of playing on Jabala’s ethnic kinship with them. A more tactful delegation was sent to flatter the Ghassanid chief. They greeted him in the manner in which "Arab kings used to be greeted", thus raising their status in his eyes and he drew them closer. They told him that as an Arab of noble lineage he would be greatly honored by the Muslims if only he converted to Islam. Jabala again turned the summons down: “I do not like that [Islam] or any other [religion], for I am attached to my own religion.” He then spoke to them kindly, as kinfolk: “You are pleased with one thing [Islam], and we are pleased with another [Christianity]. You keep to your religion while we keep to ours.” The emissaries then asked him to simply abstain from fighting alongside the Romans and base his decision on whether to convert to Islam on the battle’s outcome. Again he refused, and the wheedling ended: the delegation threatened to crush his skull and slaughter him. Jabala was infuriated and declared, “By Christ and the Cross, I will surely fight for Rome, even if against all my nearest kin!”. Qays ibn Sa'd replied, "You will thus be of the destroyed ones. We
have come to invite you to Islam because your lineage links up to ours. If you refuse then you will taste of such a terrible war wherein a toddler will age before his time and become an old man. He then sprang up and said to the Muslims, "Arise with the blessings and help of Allah Most High and in His complete obedience. To Hell with this man!" Jabalah got up replying, "Be prepared for the battle tomorrow. Negotiations ended there.

Assessment
Shahid considers the existence of Jabala as possible "evidence" for the Byzantines' revival of the Ghassanid phylarchate following its destruction during the Sasanian Persian invasion of Byzantine Syria in 614. The historian Greg Fisher assesses Jabala as "a semi-mythical figure" used in the literature to "test the purity of the new [Muslim] faith, celebrate the greatness of the empire that the  [Muslim conquerors] supplanted, and serve all kinds of other useful literary and rhetorical purposes".

References

Bibliography

Further reading

640s deaths
7th-century Ghassanid kings
Converts to Oriental Orthodoxy from Islam
Generals of Heraclius
Legendary Arab people
People of the Muslim conquest of the Levant
Year of birth unknown